Francis Burton Harrison (December 18, 1873 – November 21, 1957) was an American statesman who served in the United States House of Representatives and was appointed governor-general of the Philippines by President of the United States Woodrow Wilson. Harrison was a prominent adviser to the president of the Philippine Commonwealth, as well as the next four presidents of the Republic of the Philippines. He is the only former governor-general of the Philippines to be awarded Philippine citizenship.

Early life
Harrison was born in New York City, to Burton Harrison, a lawyer and private secretary to Confederate President Jefferson Davis, and Constance Cary Harrison, novelist and social arbiter. Through his mother, Harrison was great-grandson of Virginia-planter, Thomas Fairfax, 9th Lord Fairfax of Cameron. Through Fairfax in birth and marriage, Harrison was also relative to United States founding fathers: Gouverneur Morris (his great-great-uncle), Thomas Jefferson, the Randolphs, the Ishams, the Carters, and Confederate General Robert E. Lee.

Harrison graduated from Yale College in 1895, where he was a member of the Psi Upsilon fraternity and the secret society Skull and Bones, and from the New York Law School in 1897. From 1897 to 1899, Harrison was an instructor in the Evening Division at New York Law School. He later left to serve in United States Army during the Spanish–American War, as an assistant adjutant general with the rank of captain.

U.S. Congress
A member of the Democratic Party, Harrison was elected to the 58th United States Congress, and served from March 4, 1903, to March 3, 1905. In 1904, Harrison ran unsuccessfully for lieutenant governor of New York. Afterwards he resumed the practice of law. He was again elected to the 60th, 61st, 62nd and 63rd United States Congresses, and served from March 4, 1907, to September 3, 1913, when he resigned to become governor-general of the Philippines. His Harrison Narcotics Tax Act was eventually passed on December 17, 1914.

During his service in the Far East, Harrison was a candidate for the Democratic nomination in the 1920 presidential election. He lost the nomination to Governor of Ohio James M. Cox at the Democratic National Convention in San Francisco, who eventually lost to the Republican candidate Warren G. Harding.

Governor-general

Harrison was governor-general of the Philippines from 1913 to 1921 and advocated for and oversaw the process of Filipinization, or the transfer of authority to Filipinos in the United States territory's Insular Government to better prepare for independence. He was governor-general during the passages of the Philippine Autonomy Act, otherwise known as the Jones Act, which converted the partially elected Philippine Legislature with the appointed Philippine Commission as the upper house and the elected Philippine Assembly as the lower house, to a fully elected Philippine Legislature with the Philippine Senate replacing the now-dissolved Philippine Commission and the Philippine Assembly renamed the House of Representatives of the Philippines.

Despite the length of his tenure as governor-general he vetoed only five bills, the least number by any American governor-general in the Philippines. His pro-Filipino stance made him a popular figure in the Philippines but also the object of criticism of conservative Americans who viewed his liberal governance as not supportive enough of U.S. interests.

Under his administration, the governor-general's Spanish-era mansion called Malacañang Palace was expanded with the construction of an executive building. When he left the Philippines, Harrison lived in Scotland until being recalled to the Philippines in 1934 during a period of transition from an unincorporated territory of the United States to the Commonwealth of the Philippines.

Political adviser
Manuel L. Quezon became the first president of the Commonwealth and Harrison was asked to be Quezon's principal advisor in November 1935. He served in that capacity for ten months. In 1936, Harrison expressed interest in acquiring Filipino citizenship but did not fulfill the required years of residency under the Naturalization Law. Upon Quezon's initiative, the National Assembly passed Commonwealth Act No. 79, making him a naturalized Filipino citizen. Harrison returned to the position of advisor upon Quezon's request in May 1942, after Filipino and American troops had surrendered the Bataan Peninsula and Corregidor Island during World War II and Quezon went into exile in the United States. Harrison would serve the government-in-exile.

From November 1946 to February 1947, Harrison served as commissioner of claims in the civil service of the United States Army in Manila. He later served as an advisor to the first four presidents of the new Philippine Republic after the country's independence in 1946, serving as special adviser of foreign affairs to Manuel Roxas.

After this latest service to the Philippines, Harrison retired to Spain for six years, then chose to move to Califon, New Jersey in August 1957.

Personal life
Harrison's first wife was Mary Crocker, daughter of California railroad and mining magnate Charles Frederick Crocker. They were married on June 7, 1900, at St. Mary's Church in Tuxedo Park, New York. She died in 1905 in an automobile accident leaving Harrison to raise two small daughters, the elder Virginia Randolph Harrison and the younger Barbara Harrison Wescott. Harrison would marry and divorce four more times to: Mabel Judson Cox, Elizabeth Wrentmore (divorced by Wrentmore in 1927 due to abandonment), Margaret Wrentmore, and Doria Lee. His only son, Dr. Francis Burton "Kiko" Harrison, Jr., (1921 - 2014), subject in a 1942 series of photographs by George Platt Lynes, was a product of his third marriage.  His last wife, Maria Teresa Larrucea, a young Basque woman, was born in Amorebieta (Bizkaia, Spain) and outlived Harrison.

Death
Harrison died on November 21, 1957, at Hunterdon Medical Center in Raritan Township near Flemington, New Jersey. He willed that he be buried in the Philippines and he was interred in the Manila North Cemetery in La Loma, Manila.

Legacy
F.B. Harrison Avenue in the Metro Manila city of Pasay, starting in Baclaran, Parañaque and ends in Pablo Ocampo Street (formerly Vito Cruz) in the City of Manila, was named after him. Harrison Road in Baguio, a major thoroughfare beginning in the city center past Burnham Park and ending near the Baguio Convention Center, is also named for Harrison.

Published works
 The Corner-Stone of Philippine Independence (1922)
 Indo-China, A Sportsman's Opportunity (1933, with Archibald Cary Harrison)
 Origins of the Philippine Republic: Extracts from the Diaries and Records of Francis Burton Harrison (1974, posthumous)

References

Further reading

External links

 An Act Declaring the Honorable Francis Burton Harrison, Former Governor-General of the Philippines, a Citizen of the Philippines, and Conferring Upon Him all the Rights, Duties, Privileges and Prerogatives of Filipino Citizenship, Commonwealth Act No. 79 (October 26, 1936)

1873 births
1957 deaths
American emigrants to the Philippines
American military personnel of the Spanish–American War
Burials at the Manila North Cemetery
Democratic Party members of the United States House of Representatives from New York (state)
Governors-General of the Philippine Islands
Naturalized citizens of the Philippines
New York Law School alumni
People from Califon, New Jersey
United States Army officers
Yale University alumni
Crocker family
Military personnel from New Jersey
Psi Upsilon